Laura Bon (1825–1904) was an Italian stage actress.

She was the lover of Victor Emmanuel II of Italy between 1844 and 1858, and had a daughter with him. She resumed her acting career in 1858, and enjoyed a successful stage career until the 1870s.

References 

1825 births
1904 deaths
19th-century Italian actresses
Mistresses of Italian royalty